In mathematics, a rose (also known as a bouquet of n circles) is a topological space obtained by gluing together a collection of circles along a single point.  The circles of the rose are called petals.  Roses are important in algebraic topology, where they are closely related to free groups.

Definition 

A rose is a wedge sum of circles.  That is, the rose is the quotient space C/S, where C is a disjoint union of circles and S a set consisting of one point from each circle.  As a cell complex, a rose has a single vertex, and one edge for each circle.  This makes it a simple example of a topological graph.

A rose with n petals can also be obtained by identifying n points on a single circle.  The rose with two petals is known as the figure eight.

Relation to free groups 

The fundamental group of a rose is free, with one generator for each petal.  The universal cover is an infinite tree, which can be identified with the Cayley graph of the free group.  (This is a special case of the presentation complex associated to any presentation of a group.)

The intermediate covers of the rose correspond to subgroups of the free group.  The observation that any cover of a rose is a graph provides a simple proof that every subgroup of a free group is free (the Nielsen–Schreier theorem)

Because the universal cover of a rose is contractible, the rose is actually an Eilenberg–MacLane space for the associated free group F.  This implies that the cohomology groups Hn(F) are trivial for n ≥ 2.

Other properties 

 Any connected graph is homotopy equivalent to a rose.  Specifically, the rose is the quotient space of the graph obtained by collapsing a spanning tree.
 A disc with n points removed (or a sphere with n + 1 points removed) deformation retracts onto a rose with n petals.  One petal of the rose surrounds each of the removed points.
 A torus with one point removed deformation retracts onto a figure eight, namely the union of two generating circles. More generally, a surface of genus g with one point removed deformation retracts onto a rose with 2g petals, namely the boundary of a fundamental polygon.
 A rose can have infinitely many petals, leading to a fundamental group which is free on infinitely many generators.  The rose with countably infinitely many petals is similar to the Hawaiian earring: there is a continuous bijection from this rose onto the Hawaiian earring, but the two are not homeomorphic.  A rose with infinitely many petals is not compact, whereas the Hawaiian earring is compact.

See also 

 Bouquet graph
 Free group
 List of topologies
 Petal projection
 Quadrifolium
 Topological graph

References 
 
 
 

Topological spaces
Algebraic topology